Robert S. Haltiwanger is Professor of Biochemistry at the State University of New York at Stony Brook and Chair of the Department of Biochemistry and Cellular Biology.  Haltiwanger received his Bachelor of Science from Duke University and then his doctorate from the same institution. His primary field of interest is glycobiology with a focus on O-fucose modifications, NOTCH protein, and related projects.

Research

References

External links
Robert S. Haltiwanger's faculty page at Stony Brook

American biochemists
Stony Brook University faculty
Living people
Year of birth missing (living people)